In taxonomy, the Acidilobales are an order of the Thermoprotei.

Phylogeny
The currently accepted taxonomy is based on the List of Prokaryotic names with Standing in Nomenclature (LPSN)  and National Center for Biotechnology Information (NCBI)

References
 help

Further reading

Scientific journals

Scientific books

Scientific databases

External links

Archaea taxonomic orders
Thermoproteota